New Bermuda is the third studio album by American blackgaze band Deafheaven. It was released on October 2, 2015 through the Anti- record label.

Background
The album was recorded live in April 2015 with Sunbather producer and engineer Jack Shirley at 25th Street Recording in Oakland, California and Atomic Garden Recording in Palo Alto, California. The cover art of the album features an oil painting by Allison Schulnik.

The album trailer was released on July 27, 2015. On August 18, 2015, the band shared the first track from the album, "Brought to the Water". On September 15, 2015, the band shared the track "Come Back" from the album. On September 23, 2015, the album became available for streaming on NPR's website.

Critical reception

New Bermuda was met with rave reviews from music critics. At Metacritic, which assigns a normalized rating out of 100 to reviews from mainstream critics, the album received an average score of 85, based on 17 reviews, which indicates "universal acclaim".

The A.V. Club reviewer David Anthony stated that the album "doesn't break down the walls of metal, instead it expands its confines, allowing Deafheaven to include subgenres that rarely mix while injecting more outside references." Anthony further considered New Bermuda as a proof of "how progressive of a genre metal can be, purists be damned." Allmusic critic Paul Simpson described the album as "a powerful, enrapturing experience", writing: "New Bermuda finds Deafheaven continuing to effortlessly traverse genre borders and create transcendent music." Sean Barry of Consequence of Sound thought that the album's "audacity and stylistic shifts may have resulted in an album that's not quite as much like coming home as Sunbather, but it shows a genuine and fascinating maturation in a band that deserves to remain in the spotlight for all the right reasons." Drowned in Sounds regarded the album as "a rather stupendous record from a band who may, now if not before, be on the verge of genuine greatness."

Josiah Hughes of Exclaim! described the record as "an album that blows Sunbather out of the water". Hughes further added: "On New Bermuda, Deafheaven's myriad ideas are expertly, logically organized across five tracks." The Guardian critic Lanre Bakare thought: "While claims they've got a "pop-like accessibility" feel overstated, those who like the loud bits of Mogwai and the more melodic moments of Dillinger Escape Plan will have found the metal band for them." Pitchforks Jayson Greene stated that the album is "more overwhelming than Sunbather". Spin critic Andy O'Connor described the album as "ace metal" and stated: "In spite of Bermuda leaning less on the shoegaze that has defined Deafheaven, the album still has some of their most beautiful moments and tightest songwriting." Uncut wrote: "offers a tumultuous post metal that on passages of "Baby Blue" and "Brought To The Water," remind one more of the ethereal wandering of shoegaze."

Accolades

Track listing

Personnel
Deafheaven
 George Clarke – vocals
 Kerry McCoy – guitar
 Daniel Tracy – drums
 Stephen Clark – bass
 Shiv Mehra – guitar

Additional personnel
 Jack Shirley – production, engineering, recording
 Allison Schulnik – artwork
 Nick Steinhardt – design

Charts

References

External links
 

2015 albums
Deafheaven albums
Anti- (record label) albums
Albums produced by Jack Shirley